Dorsal digital nerves may refer to:

 Dorsal digital nerves of foot
 Dorsal digital nerves of radial nerve
 Dorsal digital nerves of ulnar nerve